Windigo Lake is a lake in the Kenora District in Northern Ontario, Canada. It is situated at the end of the Northern Ontario Resource Trail.

See also
List of lakes in Ontario

References 

 

Lakes of Kenora District